The name Halong has been used to name four tropical cyclones in the northwestern Pacific Ocean. The name was contributed by Vietnam after Halong Bay, a UNESCO World Heritage site and popular tourist attraction in northern Vietnam.

 Typhoon Halong (2002) (T0207, 10W, Inday) – struck Japan.
 Tropical Storm Halong (2008) (T0804, 05W, Cosme)
 Typhoon Halong (2014) (T1411, 11W, Jose) – a Category 5-equivalent super typhoon
 Typhoon Halong (2019) (T1923, 24W) – a Category 5-equivalent super typhoon

Pacific typhoon set index articles